John Ross (October 2, 1926 – February 18, 2017) was a scientist in physical chemistry and the Camille and Henry Dreyfus Professor of Chemistry at Stanford University.

Unraveling the mechanisms of complex chemical reactions, Ross opened new avenues in physical chemistry through the development of groundbreaking methods to study complex reactions within intact systems. His theoretical and experimental studies in statistical mechanics and chemical kinetics proved new means to reveal details of biochemical reactions taking place far from equilibrium and involving many chemical species.

Education and career
Born in Vienna in 1926, Ross left Austria with his parents only days before the outbreak of World War II. They settled in New York, where he studied chemistry at Queens College (B.S. 1948), with a two-year interruption to serve in the Army from 1944 to 1946. After completing his degree, he went on to perform doctoral research in physical chemistry, studying gas transport properties under the guidance of Isador Amdur at the Massachusetts Institute of Technology (Ph.D. 1951). This led to postdoctoral work in gas thermometry and the statistical mechanical theory of irreversible processes with physical chemist John Kirkwood at Yale. Ross began his faculty career as assistant professor in chemistry at Brown University in 1953. There, he launched a program to test the viscosity of liquids as a function of temperature and pressure with unprecedented precision. Two years later, he and physical chemist Edward Forbes Greene began nearly two decades of groundbreaking work developing the use of molecular beams to examine the molecular dynamics – revealing details of molecular collisions, dispersion, and more during chemical reactions. In 1966 Ross joined the Chemistry Department faculty at MIT, where he served as chair from 1966 to 1971. He came to Stanford in 1979 as professor of chemistry and was department chair from 1983 to 1989. Among many honors recognizing his broad contributions in physical chemistry, Professor Ross was named to the National Academy of Sciences and American Academy of Arts and Sciences and received the U.S. National Medal of Science in 2000 from President Clinton.

In his research at Stanford, Ross examined experimental and theoretical investigations in new approaches to the determination of complex reaction mechanisms, the formation of the thermodynamics and statistical mechanics of systems far from equilibrium, the chemical implementation of digital and parallel computers, and application of these studies to biological reaction mechanisms. His contributions in reaction kinetics and dynamics changed chemists’ understanding of reactivity and why many chemical phenomena occur, opening new fields in chemical science.

Honors and awards
 Member of the National Academy of Sciences, 1976; 
 Irving Langmuir Award in Chemical Physics, American Chemical Society, 1992; 
 Dean's Award for Distinguished Teaching, Stanford University, 1992–93; 
 National Medal of Science, 1999; 
 Peter Debye Award in Physical Chemistry, American Chemical Society, 2001;
 Austrian Cross of Honor for Science and Art, 1st class, 2002;
 ACS Theodore William Richards Medal, 2004

External links
 Natl. Medal of Science
 w/ bibliography
 Raymond Kapral, "John Ross", Biographical Memoirs of the National Academy of Sciences (2018)

1926 births
2017 deaths
Members of the United States National Academy of Sciences
National Medal of Science laureates
American physical chemists
Stanford University Department of Chemistry faculty
Recipients of the Austrian Cross of Honour for Science and Art, 1st class
Yale University staff
Queens College, City University of New York alumni
Massachusetts Institute of Technology alumni